Tamagario is a Papuan language of Papua, Indonesia.

Yogo may be a distinct language.

References

Languages of western New Guinea
Kayagar languages